Chemins de fer et transport automobile (CFTA) is a French transport company descended from the Société générale des chemins de fer économiques which operated thousands of kilometres of local railways (mostly narrow gauge) in France in the late 19th century through to the 1930s.

CFTA became a part of the Veolia Transport as part of the Veolia Cargo division of the company. In 2009 Veolia Cargo was acquired by SNCF and Eurotunnel, with CFTA becoming Europorte proximity and part of Eurotunnel as part of its Europorte freight subsidiary.

The CFTA Cargo subsidiary still runs the freight railways around Gray and Châtillon-sur-Seine, famous for being the last place where main line steam locomotives operated in France.

References

Transport companies of France